Gornja Sokolovica is a village in the municipality of Knjaževac, Serbia. According to the 2002 census, the village has a population of 41 people.

References

Populated places in Zaječar District